The following are the national records in athletics in Slovakia maintained by its national athletics federation: Slovak Athletic Federation (SAZ). Of the records from the era of Czechoslovakia, those who represented a Slovak club at the time of the record are included.

Outdoor

Key to tables:

+ = en route to a longer distance

h = hand timing

Mx = mixed competition

OT = oversized track (> 200m in circumference)

Men

Women

Mixed

Indoor

Men

Women

Notes

References
General
Slovak Records 16 August 2022 updated
Specific

External links
SAZ web site

Slovakia
Records
Athletics
Athletics